Nicholas Sean-Gaylor Singleton (born January 6, 2004) is an American football running back for the Penn State Nittany Lions. He was named the Big Ten's Freshman of the Year in 2022.

High school career 
Singleton attended Governor Mifflin High School in his hometown of Shillington, Pennsylvania. In his high school career, Singleton recorded 116 touchdowns and 6,326 rushing yards. As a senior, Singleton rushed for 2,043 rushing yards and 41 touchdowns while being named the Gatorade Football Player of the Year. A top player in his class, he committed to play college football at Penn State University over offers from Alabama, Notre Dame, and Ohio State.

College career 
As a freshman in 2022, Singleton led Penn State in rushing yards (941) and rushing touchdowns (10), while being named the Thompson–Randle El Freshman of the Year. He averaged 25.8 yards per kickoff return, including a 100-yard kickoff return against Rutgers, and he was named to the Second-team All-Big Ten as a kick returner.

References

External links 
Penn State Nittany Lions bio

Penn State Nittany Lions football players
Players of American football from Pennsylvania
American football running backs
Living people
2004 births